Cremo may refer to:

Cremo, West Virginia, an unincorporated community in Calhoun County
Michael Cremo, an American freelance researcher